General Nuh Ismail Tani is the Chief of Staff of Somaliland Armed Forces. He hails from the Jibril Abokor, a Sa'ad Musa sub-division of the Habr Awal Isaaq clan that predominantly inhabits the Gabiley region.

Chief of Staff
He was appointed as the Chief of Staff of Somaliland Armed Forces in 2003 and served as Chief of Staff under two different Presidents of Somaliland before being dismissed by Ahmed Mahamoud Silanyo on 11 December 2011. He was succeeded by General Mohamed Hasan Abdullahi. He was reinstated in August 2016.

References

Year of birth missing (living people)
Somalian military leaders
Living people
Somalian generals
People from Hargeisa